The following highways are numbered 519:

Ireland
 R519 Regional Road

United States